Roger Goossens (7 December 1926 – 21 December 2019) was a Belgian field hockey player. He competed at the 1948 Summer Olympics, the 1952 Summer Olympics, the 1956 Summer Olympics and the 1960 Summer Olympics.

References

External links
 

1926 births
2019 deaths
Belgian male field hockey players
Olympic field hockey players of Belgium
Field hockey players at the 1948 Summer Olympics
Field hockey players at the 1952 Summer Olympics
Field hockey players at the 1956 Summer Olympics
Field hockey players at the 1960 Summer Olympics
Field hockey players from Brussels